Kaung Htet Zaw (born 16 June 1986) is a Burmese television host and MC. He is best known for hosting in notable Channel 7 TV programs, Family Feud, The Money Drop Myanmar and MRTV-4 TV programs, MasterChef Myanmar season 1 and Dancing with the Stars Myanmar.

Early life
Kaung Htet Zaw was born on 16 June 1986 in Yangon, Myanmar.

Career
Kaung Htet Zaw acted in many TV commercials including Vitacap, Shwe Na Gar Paung Way and so on. He worked as a brand ambassador for Vitacap.

Television programs
Family Feud Myanmar (2016–2022)
The Money Drop Myanmar (2017–present)
MasterChef Myanmar (2018)
Dancing with the Stars Myanmar (2019)
Let's Go and Eat (2019–present)
At Home (2021)

References

External links

1986 births
Living people
Masters of ceremonies
Burmese television presenters
People from Yangon